Fellows of the Royal Society elected in 1815.

Fellows

 Thomas Allan (1777–1833)
 Henry Benjamin Hanbury Beaufoy (1786–1851)
 Barrington Pope Blachford (d. 1816)
 Peter Patten Bold (d. 1819)
 Phineas Bond (1748–1815)
 David Brewster (1781–1868)
 Thomas William Carr (d. 1829)
 James Cocks (b. 1774)
 James Dawkins (b. 1760)
 William Francis Eliott (1792–1864)
 William Henry Fitton (1780–1861)
 Thomas Grey (d. 1846)
 John Haighton (1755–1823)
 William Harrison
 George Harry Fleetwood Hartopp (1785–1824)
 Christopher Hawkins (1758–1829)
 Henry Holland (1788–1873)
 James Ivory (1765–1842)
 William Martin Leake (1777–1860)
 Charles Mackenzie (1788–1862)
 George Steuart Mackenzie (1780–1848)
 George D'Oyly (1778–1846)
 Thomas Lister Parker (1779–1858)
 Roger Pettiward (1754–1833)
 John Delafield Phelps (1765–1843)
 John Rickman (1771–1840)
 Peter Mark Roget (1779–1869)
 Benjamin Travers (1783–1858)
 Samuel Turner
 John William Ward (1781–1833)
 George Warrender (1782–1849)
 John Whishaw (1765–1840)

Foreign members

 Jean-Baptiste Biot (1774–1862) ForMemRS
 Joseph Louis Gay-Lussac (1778–1850) ForMemRS
 Alexander von Humboldt (1769–1859) ForMemRS

References

1815 in science
1815
1815 in the United Kingdom